Sari language may refer to:
Sari language (Adamawa) or Dugun, a Dii language spoken in Cameroon
Sari language (Uruguay) or Chaná, an extinct Charruan language that was once spoken in Uruguay
Saari language, an Eastern Beboid language of Cameroon
 A dialect of Enga language, a language of the East New Guinea Highlands